The 1931–1932 SM-sarja season was again played as a cup. There were 6 Teams from 3 Cities.

First round

TaPa and HPS through to Semifinals.

Semifinals

HPS and HJK through to Final.

Final

Helsingin Jalkapalloklubi wins the 1931–1932 Finnish ice hockey championship.

References
 Hockey Archives

Liiga seasons
1931–32 in Finnish ice hockey
Fin